RK Vikingi is a Latvian rugby club based in the Liepaja town.

External links
RK Vikingi at draugiem.lv

Latvian rugby union teams
South Kurzeme Municipality